The 1995 World Fencing Championships were held from 18 July to 23 July 1995 in The Hague, Netherlands.

Medal summary

Men's events

Women's events

Medal table

References
FIE Results

World Fencing Championships
International fencing competitions hosted by the Netherlands
20th century in The Hague
World Fencing Championships
Sports competitions in The Hague
World Championships
World Fencing Championships